Statistics of Kuwaiti Premier League for the 1986–87 season.

Overview
It was contested by 8 teams, and Kazma Sporting Club won the championship.

League standings

References
Kuwait - List of final tables (RSSSF)

1987
1986–87 in Asian association football leagues
1